Ladha Tehsil is a subdivision located in South Waziristan district, Khyber Pakhtunkhwa, Pakistan. The population is 109,710 according to the 2017 census.

See also
Alamzaib Mahsud
Mulla Powinda
Said Alam Mahsud

See also 
 List of tehsils of Khyber Pakhtunkhwa

References 

Tehsils of Khyber Pakhtunkhwa
Populated places in South Waziristan